The Ramsund Bridge is a bridge in Troms og Finnmark county, Norway. It crosses the Ramsundet strait between the village of Ramsund on the mainland and the island of Tjeldøya in Tjeldsund Municipality. The bridge was built in 1986 to replace a ferry route.

See also
List of bridges in Norway
List of bridges in Norway by length
List of bridges
List of bridges by length

References

Tjeldsund
Road bridges in Troms og Finnmark
Bridges completed in 1986
1986 establishments in Norway